Interdnestrcom is a Transnistrian telecommunication company providing mobile communication services for Transnistria, a breakaway unrecognized state internationally recognized as part of Moldova. It was established in 1998. As well as providing mobile phone services, it also provides dial-up and ISDN internet access.

Internet 

Interdnestrcom provides Internet access in the Transnistrean territory under the brand of OK. Internet access is provided via ADSL. OK's services are available in all large towns in Transnistria.

TV 
Interdnestrcom provides TV services among which: analog television (up to June 2011 ), digital television and IP-television.

Fixed telephony 
Is provided under the brand Transtelecom.

Mobile telephony 
Interdnestrcom operates in CDMA2000 and VoLTE standard on 800 MHz frequency. The coverage area includes almost all Transnistria region and several towns of Moldova which are considered outside Transnistria region and Ukraine.

Support service 
198 — uniform number of support on all lines of business IDC from any mobile or fixed phone of Transnistria.

Criticism

Skype and other VoIP clients blocking 
On 6–7 November 2010 some subscribers began expecting troubles with access to VoIP soft. As the result of this after some time all the subscribers of Interdnestrcom were blocked VoIP services including Skype and many others. International calls with the help of such software became impossible.

References

External links 
 Interdnestrcom official site
 Page on Russian Wikipedia :ru:Интерднестрком

See also 
Internet in Moldova
Communications in Transnistria

Companies of Transnistria
Telecommunications in Moldova
Mobile phone companies of Moldova
Telecommunications companies of Moldova
1998 establishments in Moldova
Telecommunications companies established in 1998